AAEC may refer to:

 Association of American Editorial Cartoonists, active in the United States, Canada and Mexico
 Australian Atomic Energy Commission, a statutory body of the Australian government
 Fulbright Austria, the Austrian-American Educational Commission, a bilateral educational commission and Fulbright program
 Appreciable Adverse Effect On Competition, Anti-Competitive Agreements in Competition act India